Norwegian–Serbian relations are foreign relations between Norway and Serbia. Norway has an embassy in Belgrade. Serbia has an embassy in Oslo. Both countries are full members of the Council of Europe and the Organization for Security and Co-operation in Europe (OSCE).

Former Norwegian Minister of Foreign Affairs Thorvald Stoltenberg served as Special Representative of the UN Secretary-General for Yugoslavia from 1993 to 1995, remaining one of the main liaisons between the two countries.

Norway supported the 1999 NATO bombing of the Federal Republic of Yugoslavia, and later participated in the Kosovo Force.

Agreements
The two countries signed a military cooperation agreement.

See also
 Foreign relations of Norway
 Foreign relations of Serbia
 Serbs in Norway
 Norway–Yugoslavia relations
 Kosovo–Norway relations

References

External links
 Embassy of Serbia in Oslo
 Embassy of Norway in Belgrade

 
Serbia
Bilateral relations of Serbia